Phassus phalerus is a moth of the animal family Hepialidae first described by Herbert Druce in 1887. It is known from Mexico.

References

Moths described in 1887
Hepialidae
Endemic Lepidoptera of Mexico
Moths of Central America